D. C. Douglas is an American actor and voice actor. He played Pa Kettle on Syfy's Z Nation, Zepht on Star Trek: Enterprise, and has appeared in several soap operas, including Days of Our Lives and The Young and the Restless. He voiced Albert Wesker in ten Resident Evil games, Legion in Mass Effect 2 and Mass Effect 3, and Yoshikage Kira in JoJo's Bizarre Adventure: Diamond Is Unbreakable (2016).

Early life

Douglas was born in Berkeley, California. His father was a salesman and his mother is an artist, a writer, and spiritual advisor.  His maternal grandparents were vaudeville performers. His grandmother, Grace Hathaway, continued in burlesque as a dancer and his grandfather, Joe Miller, became known in San Francisco for his talks at the Theosophy Lodge and his weekly Thursday morning group walks through Golden Gate Park.

Douglas' parents divorced when he was five years old and he was raised primarily by his mother in the San Francisco Bay Area during the 1960s through the early 1980s. At age seven he decided that he was going to be an actor after watching an episode of Hollywood and the Stars. He performed in San Jose and Walnut Creek community theatre, but it was his Ygnacio Valley High School drama teacher who encouraged him to follow through on his dream.

At sixteen, Douglas traveled alone to New York to audition for Royal Academy of Dramatic Art. He wasn't accepted and while his back-up plan was to live in New York, his visit there deterred him from that idea. Instead, he chose Los Angeles and moved there in 1985.

Career

Live action

Theatre

Douglas graduated from the only accredited acting trade school in Los Angeles at the time - Estelle Harman Actors Workshop. He co-founded the improvisation troupe Section Eight and was also a member of Theatre of NOTE for several years. He produced Some Things You Need to Know Before the World Ends (A Final Evening with the Illuminati) at the Hollywood United Methodist Church as a benefit for the AIDS Healthcare Foundation, performing the role of Brother Lawrence opposite Theatre of NOTE co-founder, Kevin Carr. The production was well received and became an LA Weekly "Pick-of-the-Week." Douglas performed in many other Equity Waiver 99-seat Theatre productions throughout the 1990s.

Television

Douglas' first network TV role was on the hit ABC 90's sitcom Coach in which his 3 lines were cut in the final broadcast. In 1996, after sporadic small co-star roles, he landed a small role in Boston Common, an NBC pilot. When the show was picked up for a season he returned in a recurring role as the D.C., the antagonist to Hedy Burress's character.

Douglas' television career involved primarily conservative or antagonist roles. Highlights include 24, Star Trek: Enterprise, NYPD Blue, ER, Charmed, Without a Trace, NCIS, Criminal Minds, Castle and The Encounter.

In 2015, while pitching the producers at The Asylum a film project that would pay homage to Resident Evil 5, a zombie video game Douglas worked on and had gained fan appreciation for, they were inspired to cast him as Pa Kettle in Z Nation, a zombie Syfy show, for a 3 episode arc.

While never considered for a lead contract role on the many Los Angeles based soaps, Douglas did guest star on all of them numerous times. Most notable as the manipulative Bellman in a Days of Our Lives 1991 honeymoon arc, and as two different characters on The Young and The Restless - Chad Atherton in a 1996 arc, and Kurz, a crime boss taunting Tristan Rogers's character in a 2014 arc. In 2017, Douglas appeared on The Bold and The Beautiful for his 26th time in 20 years in his 6th role.

In 2021, Douglas announced that he is rebooting his acting career with a focus on independent cinema.

Film

Douglas' first film was 1989's Future Force with David Carradine. While all his scenes were only with Carradine, Douglas never met him as their characters only spoke through a futuristic video conference system.

Film highlights include playing a possessed ghost hunter in Black Ops with Lance Henriksen, a disturbing turn as "Dad" in Smartass with Joey King, a deranged cop in Helen Alone with Priscilla Barnes, and a harried producer in Labor Pains with Lindsay Lohan.

In 2013, he was cast as a serial killer in Apocalypse Kiss and changed his appearance to look similar to Resident Evil villain Albert Wesker. The producers were fans of Douglas' work in the video game franchise.

Douglas has worked with The Asylum since 2002, having appeared in ten films. In 2015, while working on The Asylum's Alpha House film, Douglas bonded with the film's writers, Jacob Cooney and Brandon Trenz. Together, they developed the idea for Isle of the Dead. Douglas pitched the concept to The Asylum producers David Michael Latt, David Rimawi and Paul Bales. The film was completed in 2016 with Douglas as Aiden Wexler, opposite Joey Lawrence and Maryse Mizanin, and aired on the SyFy network.

Other The Asylum film highlights include Titanic II as the hapless ship captain, Sharknado 2  as Bud, one of the only characters to die by an alligator in a shark movie, and Aquarium of the Dead as the clueless Aquarium tour guide.

In 2021, Douglas was cast in three unrelated Lifetime Network films: The Killer in My Backyard, Killer Stepmom, and Drowning In Secrets.

Producer, writer, director
in 1996, Douglas wrote, produced and starred in Falling Words, his first festival film short. In subsequent years he wrote, produced and directed The Eighth Plane, an anti-Scientology short and Freud and Darwin Sitting in a Tree, about Lewis Henry Morgan.

In 2001, he resurrected the character 'Lance Baxter' from his first film short, Falling Words and created a cabaret act, covering sad love songs that illustrated his dysfunctional relationships. It was performed at The Lava Lounge in Hollywood. In 2006, inspired by turning forty, Douglas expanded the idea into Lance Baxter: Halfway Through My Life If I'm Lucky.  The show featured original songs (lyrics by Douglas and music by Lily Popova) and comedic monologues. The show was produced at The M Bar in Hollywood and ran for several nights as a fundraiser for More Than Shelter for Seniors.

Also in 2006, his film short, Duck, Duck, Goose!, played at film festivals worldwide and received awards for the Best Short from the Seattle's True Independent Film Festival (STIFF) and Best Actor from the Trenton Film Festival.

His 2009 CGI film short, The Crooked Eye starring Fay Masterson and narrated by Linda Hunt, played at festivals and won awards for Best Narration (STIFF), Best Screenplay (HDFest) and Best Animated Short (Red Rock Film Festival).

In 2016 he wrote, edited and directed a Halloween animated short, Ginger & Snapper, with Rachael Leone. The short includes voice actors Lacey Chabert, Steve Blum, Liam O'Brien, Laura Bailey and Roger Craig Smith.

From 2007 to 2019, Douglas voiced the Resident Evil villain, Albert Wesker. As his fan following grew he began producing fan service videos. Popular entries include Old Spice spoof, 12 Days of Evil, and Covid-19: Albert F. Wesker Tips.

In 2017, Douglas created and launched MSM Breaking News!: Fake Trump Cartoons, an animated web series satirizing the Donald Trump presidency as well as the Robert Mueller investigation into the Russian interference in the 2016 United States elections. A typical episode was written by Douglas and produced by his animator, Rachael Leone. Guest voice actors have included Steve Blum, Maurice LaMarche, Mary Elizabeth McGlynn, Todd Haberkorn and Mark Meer, among others.

Voiceover

Early Voiceover career
Douglas began his voice acting career in the early 1990s by doing walla for low budget action and erotic films that were usually aired on Showtime late night. By the 21st century he had stopped doing general walla work altogether, but did occasional unique ADR jobs, including voice matching Guy Pearce in Factory Girl and Kevin Spacey in Fred Clause, as well as voicing a TV reporter in 50/50 and Brad Pitt's SpaceCom computer therapist in Ad Astra.

Video games
Douglas has voiced a variety of characters in video games, though primarily low-voiced villains. Highlights include The Master in the Buffy the Vampire Slayer video game, Albert Wesker in the Resident Evil series as well as Marvel vs. Capcom (9 games in total from 2007 - 2019), Raven in Tekken 6, AWACS Ghost Eye in Ace Combat 6: Fires of Liberation, Commandant Alexei in Tales of Vesperia, Legion in Mass Effect 2/Mass Effect 3/Mass Effect Legendary Edition, Grimoire Noir and Pod 042 in the Nier franchise, Azrael in BlazBlue: Chrono Phantasma, Coburn in Ubisoft's The Crew and Hector Birtwhistle (H.B.) in Xenoblade Chronicles X.

Commercials and promos
Douglas was a CBS Daytime promo announcer for the summer of 2003 and has cited that job as the turning point in his voiceover career. He used the money he made from that contract and built his home studio (a rare thing for most voice artists at the time) which allowed him to leave his editing job and work solely as an actor.

National campaign highlights include the GEICO Celebrity campaign from 2006 to 2008, the McDonald's Be the Sizzle campaign from 2009 to 2010, Radio Shack's Holiday Hero campaign in 2010 and several Experian spots featuring Douglas and Tom Kenny as computers in 2014.

He has been one of the current promo voices for Sony Pix since 2018.

Animation
Highlights include Chase in Hub Network's Transformers: Rescue Bots (the longest-running Transformers series), Colonel Rawls (and many others) in Cartoon Network's Regular Show, Sylvus (the Elder) and Aikor (the Villain) in Monchichi Tribe, Newton in The Rocketeer, and a cameo in Family Guy as Superman.

Anime
Douglas avoided anime work in the early aughts due to the notorious low pay. But, during his first convention appearance in 2010, he saw the burgeoning phenomena of anime fans wanting to meet the voice actors. Douglas has said the opportunity to travel while getting paid inspired him to reach out to the local Los Angeles production houses that recorded anime. This led to some fan favorite roles, such as Yoshikage Kira in the Diamond Is Unbreakable arc of JoJo's Bizarre Adventure, Wooden Sword Ryu in Netflix's Shaman King, Edo in Netflix's Ultraman, Praetorian in Netflix's Super Crooks, and X Drake in One Piece.

Politics
In April 2010, Douglas came under fire from the Tea Party movement for a phone call he made to Freedomworks in which he left an inflammatory voice mail. A day later GEICO dropped him from the new "shocking news" series of internet commercials that were in post-production. This led to some debate in the voice-over community about whether announcers were public figures. He responded by producing a mock Tea Party PSA for YouTube that was subsequently broadcast on both Joy Behar's HLN show and Geraldo Rivera's Geraldo at Large with Douglas as a guest.

The experience inspired Douglas to continue creating short, satirical political videos. The most viewed were his Burn a Koran Day video (posted by The Huffington Post) and his Why #OccupyWallStreet? video (aired on MSNBC's The Last Word with Lawrence O'Donnell).

In November 2011, Douglas tweeted out a quote from a Tower Heist Q&A at the ArcLight Hollywood where director Brett Ratner made a disparaging remark about homosexuals. The Hollywood Reporter subsequently reported Douglas' tweet as the beginning of a controversy which led to Ratner stepping down from the 2012 Oscars. (Douglas was permanently banned from Twitter in January, 2021 for mocking Q Anon accounts.)

Douglas has also lent his voice to many liberal political organizations, including American Bridge 21st Century PAC and the non-profit progressive research and information center Media Matters for America.

Filmography

Live action

Voiceover

See also 

 Gilbert Gottfried — actor fired as voice of Aflac Duck in 2011 for jokes about the 2011 Tōhoku earthquake and tsunami

References

Further reading

External links

Instagram
Verified Profile on IGDB.com
Tea Party PSA

American male film actors
American male soap opera actors
American male stage actors
American male television actors
American male voice actors
American male video game actors
Living people
Male actors from Berkeley, California
Film directors from California
American atheists
20th-century American male actors
21st-century American male actors
Year of birth missing (living people)